The hooded berryeater (Carpornis cucullata) is a species of bird in the family Cotingidae. It is endemic to Brazil.

Its natural habitats are subtropical or tropical moist lowland forest and subtropical or tropical moist montane forest. It is becoming rare due to habitat loss.

References

hooded berryeater
hooded berryeater
Taxonomy articles created by Polbot